The London Golf Club is a privately owned  golf course located in the village of Ash, Kent, approximately 20 miles southeast of London.

History 
The golf club was originally developed by the Japanese businessman Masao Nagahara 
, in response to a perceived need for a world class golf course in the vicinity of London and purportedly at the behest of Margaret Thatcher. Although the club was originally opened in September 1993 by Sir Denis Thatcher, the official course opening was in July 1994 and was accompanied by a charity skins match between Jack Nicklaus, Seve Ballesteros and Tony Jacklin. After the original owners experienced financial difficulties, the course was purchased in 2003 by the Bendinat group (who also own the Royal Bendinat Golf Club in Mallorca ) for an undisclosed sum. Since the purchase, the club has hosted numerous tournaments on both the European Senior Tour and the European Tour, including the 2014 Volvo World Match Play Championship and
the 2018 and 2019 PGA Seniors Championship.

Courses

The Heritage Course
The Heritage Course was designed by Jack Nicklaus
one of only three courses in England under his name.

The International Course
The International Course was designed by Ron Kirby under the banner of Nicklaus Design. He has been quoted as describing
the 13th hole as "the best par 5 hole I have ever created".

Tournaments

European Open
The European Open was held over the Heritage course in 2008
and 2009.

Volvo World Matchplay Championship
The Volvo World Match Play Championship was held on the International course in 2014.

PGA Seniors Championship
The PGA Seniors Championship, now under the name of the Staysure PGA Seniors Championship was held over the International
Course in both 2018 and 2019.

London Seniors Masters
The London Seniors Masters was held over the Heritage Course in 1995 and 2005-2007

References

External links 
 Official Website

Golf clubs and courses in Kent